Group C of the 2015 FIFA Women's World Cup consisted of Japan, Switzerland, Cameroon and Ecuador. Matches were played from 8 to 16 June 2015.

Teams

Standings

In the round of 16:
Japan advanced to play Netherlands (third-placed team of Group A).
Cameroon advanced to play China PR (runner-up of Group A).
Switzerland (as one of the four best third-placed teams) advanced to play Canada (winner of Group A).

Matches

Cameroon vs Ecuador
Cameroon's 6–0 win is the biggest ever win by a team in their first ever FIFA Women's World Cup match, breaking the record of Italy, who beat Chinese Taipei 5–0 in 1991.

Japan vs Switzerland

Switzerland vs Ecuador

Japan vs Cameroon

Ecuador vs Japan

Switzerland vs Cameroon

References

External links
Official website

Group C
2015 in Cameroonian football
2015 in Ecuadorian football
Group
2014–15 in Swiss football